Plastic is a polymerized material. It may also refer to:

Science and technology
 Plastic SCM, a distributed revision control tool
 Plasticity (physics), a material that has high plasticity may be called plastic
 Phenotypic plasticity, the ability of an organism to change its phenotype in response to changes in the environment

Arts, entertainment, and media
 Plastic (2011 film), American horror film
 Plastic (2014 film), a British crime film
 Plastics (band) (1976–1981), a Japanese new wave band
 Plastic (Mitsuki Aira album), 2009
 Plastic (Joey Tafolla album), 2001
 "Plastic" (New Order song), a song by New Order from the album Music Complete
 "Plastic" (Spiderbait song), a 1999 single by Australian alt-rock band, Spiderbait
 "Plastic", a song by Prefuse 73 from the 2003 album One Word Extinguisher
 "Plastic", a single by Alanis Morissette from the 1991 album Alanis
 "Plastic", a song by Pussy Riot from Matriarchy Now
 Plastic (comic book), a comic book series published by the American company Image Comics
 Plastic arts, art forms involving physical manipulation of a plastic medium, such as sculpture or ceramics
 Plastic.com, a community-driven message board

Other uses
 Plastic, Polish video game developer most notable for Linger in Shadows
 Plastic, a colloquial term for a credit card or debit card

See also
 
 
 Plastik, 1999 album by Oomph!
 Plastique (disambiguation)